State Route 217 (SR 217) is a state highway in the U.S. state of California that serves as a spur route from U.S. Route 101 to the University of California, Santa Barbara. Although the entire route is a freeway, SR 217 is officially named Ward Memorial Boulevard in honor of California State Senator Clarence C. Ward, who represented Santa Barbara County from 1941 to 1955.

Route description

It connects the University of California, Santa Barbara and the Santa Barbara Municipal Airport with U.S. Route 101, which is the major highway that connects Santa Barbara with other major cities along California's Pacific Coast. It is a freeway for its entire length.

SR 217 is part of the National Highway System, a network of highways that are considered essential to the country's economy, defense, and mobility by the Federal Highway Administration.

Exit list

See also

References

External links

California Highways - Route 217
California @ AARoads.com - State Route 217
Caltrans: Route 217 highway conditions

217
217
State Route 217
Goleta, California